Andethele is a genus of South American spiders in the family Ischnothelidae. It was first described by F. A. Coyle in 1995.  it contained only three species, all found in Peru: A. huanca, A. lucma, and A. tarma.

References

Mygalomorphae
Mygalomorphae genera